Saiwai Qixia Zhuan is a wuxia novel by Liang Yusheng first published as a serial between 18 August 1956 and 23 February 1957 in the Hong Kong newspaper Chou Mo Pao. Considered the second part of the Tianshan series of novels by Liang Yusheng, it serves as a sequel to the first part, Baifa Monü Zhuan, and is closely related to the third part, Qijian Xia Tianshan.

Plot 
The story is set in 17th-century China during the early Qing dynasty. The Uyghur tribes in Xinjiang are under attack by Qing imperial forces, who are attempting to force them into submission. Yang Yuncong, a highly skilled swordsman and the first apprentice of Reverend Huiming, gets involved in the battle by assisting the tribes in resisting the Qing invaders, earning their respect in return. He is betrayed by Chu Zhaonan, his junior who has joined the Qing forces. While Yang Yuncong and Chu Zhaonan are duelling, they are caught in a sandstorm and separated, and Yang Yuncong loses consciousness. He is saved by Nalan Minghui, the daughter of a Qing general. She secretly nurses him back to health and helps him escape from danger.

After escaping, Yang Yuncong meets "Flying Red Sash" Hamaya, a legendary warrior among the Uyghur tribes and the apprentice of "White Haired Demoness" Lian Nichang. Hamaya's lover, the singer Yabulu, had betrayed their tribe and caused the death of her father. Hamaya seeks vengeance on Yabulu, captures him and brings him back to her tribe for punishment. Along the way, they are ambushed by Chu Zhaonan and Qing soldiers. Yang Yuncong teams up with Hamaya to defeat and capture Chu Zhaonan; Yang Yuncong spares Chu Zhaonan and frees him on account of their past senior-junior relationship. Back in Hamaya's tribe, her fellow tribesmen find Yabulu guilty and want him dead. Hamaya suppresses her sorrow, and personally kills Yabulu to deliver justice. With Yang Yuncong's help, Hamaya wins a martial arts contest and becomes the new chief of her tribe. By then, Hamaya has secretly developed romantic feelings for Yang Yuncong.

Yang Yuncong continues to help Hamaya and her tribe fight the Qing invaders. During this time, he meets Nalan Minghui again and they fall in love with each other. However, they are not fated to be together because they stand on opposing sides. Besides, Nalan Minghui's parents have agreed to an arranged marriage between her and Prince Dodo. In anguish, Yang Yuncong and Nalan Minghui consummate their romance and she becomes pregnant with his child.

On the other hand, Hamaya is also in love with Yang Yuncong. Although she has confessed her feelings to him, he has rejected her. Hamaya is heartbroken and her hair turns white overnight just like her master. Without Hamaya to lead them, the Uyghur tribe suffers a crushing defeat by Qing forces. In the meantime, Yang Yuncong leaves Xinjiang after learning that Nalan Minghui and Prince Dodo's wedding is going to take place in Hangzhou. His eventual fate is revealed in the prologue of Qijian Xia Tianshan.

Adaptations 
In 1996, the novel was adapted into a Singaporean television series titled Legend of the White Hair Brides. It starred Huang Biren, Lina Ng and Ann Kok.

In 2005, the novels Saiwai Qixia Zhuan and Qijian Xia Tianshan were adapted into a television series titled Seven Swordsmen. It was produced by Tsui Hark, directed by Clarence Fok, and starred Vincent Zhao, Wang Xuebing, Ray Lui, Ada Choi, Qiao Zhenyu, Li Xiaoran and Wang Likun.

Novels by Liang Yusheng
1984 novels
Novels set in the Qing dynasty
Novels set in the 17th century
Hong Kong novels